Peter McNamee (born September 11, 1950 in Jamaica) is a Canadian retired professional ice hockey forward.  He played 175 games in the World Hockey Association with the Vancouver Blazers, Phoenix Roadrunners, and San Diego Mariners.

External links

Hockey-Reference

1950 births
Canadian ice hockey forwards
Living people
Penn Quakers men's ice hockey players
Phoenix Roadrunners (WHA) players
Roanoke Valley Rebels (SHL) players
San Diego Mariners players
Tidewater Sharks players
Tucson Rustlers players
Vancouver Blazers players
Canadian expatriate ice hockey players in the United States